The Demidov Prize is a national scientific prize in Russia awarded annually to the members of the Russian Academy of Sciences. Originally awarded from 1832 to 1866 in the Russian Empire, it was revived by the government of Russia's Sverdlovsk Oblast in 1993. In its original incarnation it was one of the first annual scientific awards, and its traditions influenced other awards of this kind including the Nobel Prize.

History

In 1831 Count Pavel Nikolaievich Demidov, representative of the famous Demidov family, established a scientific prize in his name. The Saint Petersburg Academy of Sciences (now the Russian Academy of Sciences) was chosen as the awarding institution. In 1832 the president of the Petersburg Academy of Sciences, Sergei Uvarov, awarded the first prizes.

From 1832 to 1866 the Academy awarded 55 full prizes (5,000 rubles) and 220 part prizes. Among the winners were many prominent Russian scientists: the founder of field surgery and inventor of the plaster immobilisation method in treatment of fractures, Nikolai Pirogov; the seafarer and geographer Adam Johann von Krusenstern, who led the first russian circumnavigation of the globe; Dmitri Mendeleev, the creator of the periodic table of elements; Boris Jacobi, pioneer of the first usable electric motors; and many others. One of the recipients was the founder's younger brother, Count Anatoly Nikolaievich Demidov, 1st Prince of San Donato, in 1847; Pavel had died in 1840, making Anatoly the Count Demidov (note that Russia did not recognize Anatoly's Italian title of prince).

From 1866, 25 years after Count Demidov's death, as was according to the terms of his bequest, there were no more awards.

In 1993, on the initiative of the vice-president of the Russian Academy of Sciences Gennady Mesyats and the governor of the Sverdlovsk Oblast Eduard Rossel, the Demidov Prize traditions were restored. The prize is awarded for outstanding achievements in natural sciences and humanities. The winners are elected annually among the members of the Russian Academy of Sciences. According to the tradition every year the Demidov Scientific Foundation chooses three or four academicians to receive the award. The prize includes a medal, a diploma and $10,000. The awards ceremony takes place every year at the Governor's Palace of Sverdlovsk Oblast, in Yekaterinburg, Russia. The recipients of the Prize also give lectures at the Ural State University (Demidov Lecture).

Winners (1832-1866)

Winners (from 1993)

See also 

 List of general science and technology awards 
 List of biology awards
 List of chemistry awards
 List of mathematics awards
 List of physics awards

References

Bibliography
 (in Russian) N. A. Mezenin: Лауреаты Демидовских премий Петербургской Академии наук. Л., Наука, 1987.
 (in Russian) Yuri Alexandrovich Sokolov, Zoya Antonovna Bessudnova, L. T. Prizhdetskaya: Отечественные действительные и почетные члены Российской академии наук 18-20 вв. Геология и горные науки.- М.: Научный мир, 2000.

External links
 Demidov Foundation short history
 List of all the winners of the full Demidov Prize
 Demidov Prize and Demidov Lecturing at Lebedev Physical Institute web site

 
Physics awards
Chemistry awards
Mathematics awards
Biology awards
Awards established in 1993